Majuli College  is based at Kamalabari in Majuli, Assam, India. It was founded in 1962, and is affiliated to AHSEC and Dibrugarh University besides being recognized by the University Grants Commission of India (UGC). The college is located on a fortified campus surrounded by a few Vaishnavite monasteries called satras and lush-green paddy fields.

Courses
The college offers Higher Secondary, Undergraduate and Postgraduate courses. It periodically organizes career counselling sessions, symposia and popular and motivational talks, and has started job-oriented multi-utility diploma and certificate courses designed to help students build careers. The college also facilitates undergraduate and postgraduate education through distance learning with Krishna Kanta Handiqui State Open University (KKHSOU) and Dibrugarh University.

 Higher Secondary Programme
 Arts
 Science

 Bachelor Programme

 Bachelor of Arts
 Bachelor of Science

 Masters Programme

 Postgraduate courses under the Distance Education Scheme of Dibrugarh University in Assamese language, Economics, History, Mathematics, Political Science and Sociology.

Library
The college provides digital classroom and library facilities to students. In the year 2012, The library was renamed after the first principal of this college as  "SHIKSHA RATNA ATUL CHANDRA GOSWAMI LIBRARY".

Notable alumni
 Tarun Chandra Pamegam, former vice president of Asam Sahitya Sabha.

College Magazine
The college has published an annual magazine, "Majulian", formerly the "Majuli College Magazine", since 1965.

References

External links
 Golden jubilee of Majuli College - The Assam Tribune Online

Universities and colleges in Assam
Majuli
Colleges affiliated to Dibrugarh University
Educational institutions established in 1962
1962 establishments in Assam